João Bosco Cabral (born 7 July 1975) is a Timorese retired professional footballer who previously line up for Bali Devata and the East Timor national football team.

Career

Persija

Spending 2006 to 2008 with Persija Jakarta, Cabral was regarded as an important part of their defense.

Following retirement

Never vacillating between retirement and continuing his football career, the Timorese defender became a  travel agent and tour guide in Bali since 2013, actively following the development of Indonesian football.

Personal life

Cabral is a devout Christian.

References

External links 
 Bolaskor.com Interview
 Mengenal Kompetisi di Timor Leste yang Mulai Menggeliat

Association football defenders
1975 births
Timor-Leste international footballers
Persija Jakarta players
PSPS Pekanbaru players
Living people
Expatriate footballers in Indonesia
Persikota Tangerang players
East Timorese footballers
Bali Devata F.C. players